Vili Savolainen (born 25 October 1985, in Helsinki) is a Finnish football player, who plays as defensive midfielder or a defender.

Savolainen currently represents Tampere United of Veikkausliiga. He started playing football for Helsingin Jalkapalloklubi when he was five years old and made his debut for the senior team, when he was 17 years old. He has also played for the Finnish national team at different junior levels.

References
 Guardian Football

1985 births
Living people
Footballers from Helsinki
Finnish footballers
Veikkausliiga players
Tampere United players
Helsingin Jalkapalloklubi players
Association football defenders